Carlos E. Blanco (born April 25, 1914) was a Cuban Negro league first baseman.

A native of Bayamo, Cuba, Blanco is the older brother of fellow-Negro leaguer Heberto Blanco. He played for the New York Cubans in 1941, and went on to spend several years in the Mexican League through the mid-1950s.

References

External links
 and Baseball-Reference Black Baseball and Mexican League stats and Seamheads

1914 births
Year of death missing
New York Cubans players
Baseball first basemen
People from Bayamo
Cuban expatriate baseball players in the United States